Venus and Serena is a 2012 American documentary film that takes an inside look at lives and careers of professional tennis players, Venus and Serena Williams. The film was directed by Maiken Baird and Michelle Major. It was the official selection at the 2013 Miami International Film Festival, 2012 Toronto Film Festival, 2012 Tribeca Film Festival and 2012 Bermuda Docs Film Festival. Venus and Serena was released by Magnolia Pictures on May 10, 2013.

Cast

 Venus Williams as herself
 Serena Williams as herself
 Richard Williams as himself
 Oracene Price as herself
 Billie Jean King as herself

References

External links
 

2012 films
Tennis films
American sports documentary films
Documentary films about women's sports
Serena Williams
Venus Williams
Films about sisters
2010s English-language films
2010s American films